

Bracket

Round of 16
The draw for the round of 16 of the 2009 AFC Cup was held on 12 January 2009, along with the draw for the group stage.

West Asia

East Asia

Quarter-finals
The draw for the quarter-finals and the remaining knockout rounds took place at Kuala Lumpur, Malaysia on June 29, 2009.

First leg

Second leg

Bình Dương won 4–2 on aggregate.

5–5 on aggregate. South China won on away goals.

Al-Kuwait won 2–1 on aggregate.

0–0 on aggregate. Al-Karamah won 5–4 on penalties.

Semi-finals

First leg

Second leg

Al-Kuwait won 3–1 on aggregate.

Al-Karamah won 4–2 on aggregate.

Final

The 2009 AFC Cup Final was played on November 3 at the home ground of Al Kuwait.

External links
AFC Cup 2009 official website

References

Knockout stage